Baffin Island (formerly Baffin Land), in the Canadian territory of Nunavut, is the largest island in Canada and the fifth-largest island in the world. It also contains the city of Iqaluit, the capital of Nunavut.

Name 
This name is used for the administrative region the island is part of (Qikiqtaaluk Region), as well as in multiple places in Nunavut and the Northwest Territories, such as some smaller islands: Qikiqtaaluk in Baffin Bay and Qikiqtaaluk in Foxe Basin. In 1576, English seaman Martin Frobisher made landfall on the island, naming it "Queen Elizabeth's Foreland" and Frobisher Bay is named after him. The island is named after English explorer William Baffin, who, in 1616, came across the island while trying to discover the Northwest Passage. It was also formerly known as James Island.

Geography 

Iqaluit, the capital of Nunavut, is located on the southeastern coast. Until 1987, the town was called Frobisher Bay, after the English name for Frobisher Bay on which it is located, named for Martin Frobisher. That year the community voted to restore the Inuktitut name.

To the south lies Hudson Strait, separating Baffin Island from mainland Quebec. South of the western end of the island is the Fury and Hecla Strait, which separates the island from the Melville Peninsula on the mainland. To the east are Davis Strait and Baffin Bay, with Greenland beyond. The Foxe Basin, the Gulf of Boothia and Lancaster Sound separate Baffin Island from the rest of the Arctic Archipelago to the west and north.

The Baffin Mountains run along the northeastern coast of the island and are a part of the Arctic Cordillera. The highest peak is Mount Odin, with an elevation of at least , although some sources say . The mountain is named after geologist Sharat Kumar Roy, the chief geology curator in the Field Museum of Natural History, Chicago. Roy, a native of India, studied in India, London, and earned his Ph.D. at the University of Chicago. Shortly after he started at the Field Museum he joined the 1927-1928 Rawson-Macmillan Expedition to Baffin Island and Labrador. This 15-month expedition began in June 1927.

The two largest lakes on the island lie in the south-central part of the island: Nettilling Lake and Amadjuak Lake further south.

History
Baffin Island has been inhabited for over 3,000 years, first by the pre-Dorset, followed by the Dorset, and then by the Thule people, ancestors of the Inuit, who have lived on the island for the last thousand years. In about 986, Erik Thorvaldsson, known as Erik the Red, formed three settlements near the southwestern tip of Greenland. In late 985 or 986, Bjarni Herjólfsson, sailing from Iceland to Greenland, was blown off course and sighted land southwest of Greenland. Bjarni appears to be the first European to see Baffin Island, and the first European to see North America beyond Greenland. It was about 15 years later that the Norse Greenlanders, led by Leif Erikson, a son of Erik the Red, started exploring new areas around the year 1000. Baffin Island is thought to be Helluland, and the archaeological site at Tanfield Valley is thought to have been a trading post. The Saga of Erik the Red, 1880 translation into English by J. Sephton from the original Icelandic 'Eiríks saga rauða':

In September 2008, the Nunatsiaq News, a weekly newspaper, reported that Patricia Sutherland, who worked at the Canadian Museum of Civilization, had found archaeological remains of yarn and cordage [string], rat droppings, tally sticks, a carved wooden Dorset culture face mask depicting Caucasian features, and possible architectural remains, which indicated that European traders and possibly settlers had been on Baffin Island not later than 1000 CE. What the source of this Old World contact may have been is unclear and controversial; the newspaper article states:

Sutherland's research eventually led to a 2012 announcement that whetstones had been found with remnants of alloys indicative of Viking presence. In 2018, Michele Hayeur Smith of Brown University, who specialises in the study of ancient textiles, wrote that she does not think the ancient Arctic people, the Dorset and Thule, needed to be taught how to spin yarn: "It's a pretty intuitive thing to do."

William W. Fitzhugh, Director of the Arctic Studies Center at the Smithsonian Institution, and a Senior Scientist at the National Museum of Natural History, wrote that there is insufficient published evidence to support Sutherland's claims, and that the Dorset were using spun cordage by the 6th century. In 1992, Elizabeth Wayland Barber wrote that a piece of three-ply yarn that dates to the Paleolithic era, that ended about 10,000 BP, was found at the Lascaux caves in France. This yarn consisted of three s-twist strands that were z-plied, much like the way a three-ply yarn is made now, the Baffin Island yarn was a simple two-ply yarn. The eight sod buildings and artifacts found in the 1960s at L'Anse aux Meadows, located on the northern tip of Newfoundland Island, remains the only confirmed Norse site in North America outside of those found in Greenland.

Administration 
Baffin Island is part of the Qikiqtaaluk Region.

Demographics

The population accounts for 67.37 per cent of the 19,355 people in the Qikiqtaaluk Region, 56.51 per cent of the population of the Arctic Archipelago, and 35.38 per cent of the population of Nunavut.

As of the 2016 Canadian census the majority, 74.06 per cent, were Indigenous peoples and 25.83 per cent were non-Indigenous. This compares to 88.85 per cent and 14.12 per cent Indigenous and non-Indigenous people for Nunavut as a whole. This lower percentage of Indigenous peoples on Baffin Island results from Iqaluit being 59.29 per cent Indigenous and 40.65 per cent non-Indigenous. Of the total population 72.17 per cent are Inuit, 0.92 per cent are First Nations, and 0.73 per cent are Métis. Except for a few First Nations people in Arctic Bay all non-Inuit Indigenous peoples live in Iqaluit.

The hamlets of Kinngait (population: 1,396) and Qikiqtarjuaq (population: 593) do not lie on Baffin Island proper. Kinngait is situated on Dorset Island, which is located a few kilometres from the south eastern tip of the Foxe Peninsula. Similarly, Qikiqtarjuaq is situated on Broughton Island, which is located near the northern coast of the Cumberland Peninsula.

The Mary River Mine, an iron ore mine with an estimated 21-year life, at Mary River, may include building a railway and a port to transport the ore. This may create a temporary mining community there.

Wildlife 

Baffin Island is home to the Dewey Soper Migratory Bird Sanctuary and the Bowman Bay Wildlife Sanctuary.

The Dewey Soper Migratory Bird Sanctuary, named for J. Dewey Soper, is located on the western side of Baffin Island from Bowman Bay to the Koukdjuak River. It is an  area that was classified a wetland of international importance via the Ramsar Convention on May 24, 1982. It is home of the world's largest goose colony and supports a large number of barren-ground caribou.

The Bowman Bay Wildlife Sanctuary is also located on the western side of Baffin Island near Bowman Bay in the Great Plain of the Koukdjuak.

Baffin Island has both year-round and summer visitor wildlife. On land, examples of year-round wildlife are barren-ground caribou, polar bear, Arctic fox, red fox, Arctic hare, lemming, and Baffin Island wolf.

Barren-ground caribou herds migrate in a limited range from northern Baffin Island down to the southern part in winter, even to the Frobisher Bay peninsula, next to Resolution Island, then migrating back north in the summer. In 2012, a survey of caribou herds found that the local population was only about 5,000, a decrease of as much as 95% from the 1990s.

Arctic hares are found throughout Baffin Island. Their fur is pure white in winter and moults to a scruffy dark grey in summer. Arctic hares and lemmings are an important food source for Arctic and red foxes and Arctic wolves.

Lemmings are also found throughout the island and are a major food source for foxes, wolves and the snowy owl. In the winter, lemmings dig complicated tunnel systems through the snow drifts to get to their food supply of dry grasses and lichens.

Predators
Polar bears can be found all along the coast of Baffin Island but are most prevalent where the sea ice takes the form of pack ice, where their major food sources—ringed seals (jar seal) and bearded seals—live. Polar bears mate approximately every year, bearing one to three cubs around March. The polar bear population here is one of 19 genetically distinct demes of the circumpolar region.

Red foxes can be found predominantly in the southernmost areas of Baffin Island, away from the harshest of winter weather, though some individuals may forage and explore elsewhere. The Arctic foxes can usually be found where polar bears venture on the fast ice close to land in their search for seals. Arctic foxes are scavengers and often follow polar bears to get their leavings. They also are known to take ground-nesting birds and their eggs and chicks, such as ducks, geese, ptarmigan, seagulls, shorebirds and even snowy owls, on occasion. On Baffin Island, Arctic foxes are sometimes trapped by Inuit, but there is no longer a robust fur industry.

The Arctic wolf and the Baffin Island wolf, a grey wolf subspecies, are also year-round residents of Baffin Island. Unlike the grey wolf in southern climes, Arctic wolves often have smaller social networks, due to the barren landscape and minimal resources, thus resulting in unique hierarchies when compared with wolves found further south. For example, Arctic wolves often do not hunt in packs, although a male-female pair may hunt together.

Birds
Nesting birds are summer land visitors to Baffin Island. Baffin Island is one of the major nesting destinations from the Eastern and Mid-West flyways for many species of migrating birds. Waterfowl include eiders,  Canada goose, snow goose, cackling goose, and brant goose (brent goose). Shore birds include the phalarope, various waders (commonly called sandpipers), murres including Brünnich's guillemot, and plovers. Gull species also nest on Baffin Island and they include Sabine's gull, glaucous gull, herring gull and ivory gull.

Long-range travellers include the Arctic tern, which migrates from Antarctica every spring. The varieties of water birds that nest here include coots, loons, mallards, and many other duck species.

Marine mammals

In the water (and under the ice), the main year-round species is the ringed seal subspecies, the Arctic ringed seal. It lives offshore within  of land. It visits each one often to keep the hole open and free from ice. In March, when a female is ready to whelp, she will enlarge one of the breathing holes that has snow over it, creating a small "igloo" where she whelps one or two pups. Within three weeks the pups are in the water and swimming. In summer, some ringed seals keep to a narrow territory about  along the shoreline but may move out into the open water. In the spring they spend more time on the surface of the ice.

Summer visitors
Water species that visit Baffin Island in the summer are:

Harp seals (or saddle-backed seals), which migrate from major breeding grounds off the coast of Labrador and the southeast coast of Greenland to Baffin Island for the summer. They migrate in large pods consisting of a hundred or more seals to within  of the shoreline, which they then follow, feeding on crustaceans and fish.

Walruses, which do not migrate far off land in the winter. They merely follow the fast ice, or ice that is solidly attached to land, and stay ahead of it as the ice hardens further and further out to sea. As winter progresses, they will always remain where there is open water free of ice. When the ice melts, they move in to land and can be found basking on rocks close to shore. One of the largest walrus herds can be found in the Foxe Basin on the western side of Baffin Island.

Beluga or white whales migrate along the coast of Baffin Island; some head north to the feeding grounds in the Davis Strait between Greenland and Baffin Island, or into the Hudson Strait or any of the bays and estuaries in between. Usually travelling in pods of two or more, they can often be found very close to shore ( or less). They come up to breathe every 30 seconds or so as they make their way along the coastline eating crustaceans.

Narwhals, which are known for the males' long, spiralling single tusk, can also be found along the coast of Baffin Island in the summer. Much like their beluga cousins, they may be found in pairs or even in a large pod of ten or more males, females and newborns. They also can be often found close to the shoreline, gracefully pointing their tusks skyward as they come up for air.

The largest summer visitor to Baffin Island is the bowhead whale. Found throughout the Arctic range, one group of bowhead whales is known to migrate to the Foxe Basin, a bay on the western side of Baffin Island.

Climate 

Baffin Island lies in the path of a generally northerly airflow all year round, so, like much of northeastern Canada, it has an extremely cold climate. This brings very long, cold winters and foggy, cloudy summers, which have helped to add to the remoteness of the island. Spring thaw arrives much later than normal for a position straddling the Arctic Circle: around early June at Iqaluit in the south-east but around early- to mid-July on the north coast where glaciers run right down to sea level. Snow, even heavy snow, can occur at any time of the year, although it is least likely in July and early August.

Sea ice surrounds the island for most of the year and only disappears completely from the north coast for short, unpredictable periods from mid- to late June until the end of September.

Most of Baffin Island lies north of the Arctic Circle—all communities from Pangnirtung northwards have polar night in winter and midnight sun in summer. The eastern community of Clyde River has twilight instead of night from April 26 until May 13, continuous sunlight for 2 months from May 14 to July 28, then twilight instead of night from July 29 until August 16. This gives the community just over 3 months without true night. In the winter, the sun sets on November 22 and does not rise again until January 19 of the next year. Pond Inlet has civil twilight from December 16 to December 26. However, there is twilight for at least 4 hours per day, unlike places such as Eureka.

Like most of Nunavut and the Canadian Arctic, Baffin Island has a tundra climate (Köppen climate classification ET), although the highest ice caps have an ice cap climate (EF). The sea is frozen for most of the year, and only a few months are above freezing. There can be seasonal lag in spring.

The Barnes Ice Cap, in the middle of the island, has been retreating since at least the early 1960s, when the Geographical Branch of the then Department of Mines and Technical Surveys sent a three-man survey team to the area to measure isostatic rebound and cross-valley features of the Isortoq River. Although in the 1970s parts of Baffin Island failed to have the usual ice-free period in the summer.

Climate tables from south to north

Economic resources
The Hall Peninsula of southern Baffin Island includes the Chidliak Kimberlite Province, which had been found to include kimberlite pipes of diamond-bearing kimberlite.

Baffin Island in popular culture
The White Dawn is a 1974 film set on and filmed on Baffin Island. All performers except three Hollywood actors were Inuit who spoke their own language.

See also 
 Baffin coastal tundra

References

Notes

Maps

Further reading

 Boas, Franz, and Ludger Müller-Wille. Franz Boas Among the Inuit of Baffin Island, 1883–1884 Journals and Letters. Toronto: University of Toronto Press, 1998. 
 Kuhnlein HV, R Soueida, and O Receveur. 1996. "Dietary Nutrient Profiles of Canadian Baffin Island Inuit Differ by Food Source, Season, and Age". Journal of the American Dietetic Association. 96, no. 2: 155–62.
Lee, Alastair. Baffin Island: the Ascent of Mount Asgard. London: Frances Lincoln, 2011. 
 Matthiasson, John S. Living on the Land Change Among the Inuit of Baffin Island. Peterborough, Canada: Broadview Press, 1992. 
 Maxwell, Moreau S. Archaeology of the Lake Harbour District, Baffin Island. Mercury series. Ottawa: Archaeological Survey of Canada, National Museum of Man, National Museums of Canada, 1973.
 Sabo, George. Long Term Adaptations Among Arctic Hunter-Gatherers A Case Study from Southern Baffin Island. The Evolution of North American Indians. New York: Garland Pub, 1991. 
 Sergy, Gary A. The Baffin Island Oil Spill Project. Edmonton, Alta: Environment Canada, 1986.
 Stirling, Ian, Wendy Calvert, and Dennis Andriashek. Population Ecology Studies of the Polar Bear in the Area of Southeastern Baffin Island. [Ottawa]: Canadian Wildlife Service, 1980. 
 Utting, D. J. Report on ice-flow history, deglacial chronology, and surficial geology, Foxe Peninsula, southwest Baffin Island, Nunavut. [Ottawa]: Geological Survey of Canada, 2007. http://dsp-psd.pwgsc.gc.ca/collection%5F2007/nrcan-rncan/M44-2007-C2E.pdf.

External links 
 Logbooks of the ship "Rosie" (1924-1925) at Dartmouth College Library
 Logbooks of the schooner "Vera" (1920) at Dartmouth College Library

 Nunavut Tourism

 
Islands of Baffin Bay
Islands of Baffin Island
Inhabited islands of Qikiqtaaluk Region